Ilya Nikolaevich Lyubushkin (born 6 April 1994) is a Russian professional ice hockey defenceman currently playing for the Buffalo Sabres of the National Hockey League (NHL).

Playing career
Lyubushkin made his Kontinental Hockey League (KHL) debut playing with Lokomotiv Yaroslavl during the 2012–13 KHL season.

He played his first five professional seasons with Lokomotiv Yaroslavl before opting as a free agent following the 2017–18 season, to sign a one-year, two-way contract with the Arizona Coyotes of the National Hockey League (NHL) on 23 May 2018.

In his debut season in North America in the 2018–19 season, Lyubushkin remained on the Coyotes roster for the duration of the year, adding a defensive physical presence. He registered 4 assists in 41 games while finishing fourth on the team and third among all NHL rookies with 150 hits. On 14 June 2019, Lyubushkin was re-signed to a one-year contract to continue with the Arizona Coyotes.

As a restricted free agent, Lyubushkin returned for a third season with the Coyotes by agreeing to a one-year, $1 million contract extension on 5 October 2020. He was later returned on loan by the Coyotes to join former club, Lokomotiv Yaroslavl, until the commencement of NHL training camp on 28 October 2020.

On 19 February 2022, Lyubushkin was traded, along with teammate Ryan Dzingel, to the Toronto Maple Leafs in exchange for Nick Ritchie, and a choice of a third round pick in 2023 or a second round pick in 2025. He scored his first goal for the Maple Leafs on April 14, 2022, against the Washington Capitals.

On 13 July 2022, Lyubushkin was signed as a free agent to a two-year, $5.5 million contract with the Buffalo Sabres.

Career statistics

Regular season and playoffs

International

References

External links
 

1994 births
Living people
Arizona Coyotes players
Buffalo Sabres players
Kuznetskie Medvedi players
Lokomotiv Yaroslavl players
Russian ice hockey defencemen
Toronto Maple Leafs players
Tucson Roadrunners players
Undrafted National Hockey League players
Russian expatriate ice hockey people
Russian expatriate sportspeople in the United States
Russian expatriate sportspeople in Canada
Expatriate ice hockey players in the United States
Expatriate ice hockey players in Canada